Gordon Teoh  (born 7 May 1974), also known as Zhang Juelong, is a Malaysian composer and entertainer. He is also a music producer with experience in music technologies and techniques. Teoh has composed, arranged, and produced music in styles ranging from pop/rock, R&B, folk, and TV/radio musicals to world music, ambient/experimental music, and dance music.

He has written hit songs for Daniel Lee Chee Hun (Malaysian Idol Season 2 winner), namely "Are You Happy On Your Birthday?", "Organic Love" and "I Love To See You Now".

Awards
 1996 The Best Newcomer
 1996 Malaysia Top Ten Artist
 1997 321 Action Awards The Best Newcomer
 1998 AIM Awards The Best Male Artist
 1998 Malaysia Top Ten Artist
 1998 321 Action Awards Top Ten Creation Song "篮球教练"
 1999 Malaysia Top Ten Artist
 1999 The Best Composer "廉价的灯"
 2000 PWH Awards The Best Song Of The Year "因为我蓝"
 2001 Millennium Singer Awards "千禧年之星"
 2002 PWH Awards The Best Kids Song Of The Year "全班第一名"
 2004 PWH Awards Top Ten Creation Song "我是酱的咯"
 2004 Red Box The Best Improvement Artist Of The Year
 2005 Malaysia Top Ten Artist
 2006 PWH Awards Top Ten Creation Song "有机"

Discography
 1996 自我流放 EMI Music 发行
 1997 。。这就是生活。。EMI Music 发行
 1998 蓝 EMI Music 发行
 2002 我就是酱的咯 滚石唱片发行
 2004 关键时刻 ZCN Music/SonyBMG 发行

Product/event endorsement
 1998 Salem Cool Planet Malaysia Live Tour
 2002 XES 鞋子连锁 XES Appeal
 2004 大马元首杯篮球宣传大使
 2004 Haier
 2004 Society for the Prevention of Cruelty to Animals

References

 The NST Online

External links
 
 ZCN Music
 www.haoting.com

1974 births
Living people
Malaysian people of Chinese descent
Malaysian Mandopop singers